A cowl may refer to:

 Cowl, a garment worn by monks
 Cowl or cowling, a removable protective covering over all or part of an engine
 Cowl (chimney), a device fitted to a chimney pot to prevent wind blowing the smoke back down into the room beneath
 Cowl (oast), the revolving device found on oasts, maltings, and breweries
 Cowl unit, a body style for locomotives

Arts
 Cowl (novel), a science fiction novel
 Crimson Cowl, the name of some Marvel Comics characters
 Legend of the White Cowl, a Russian Orthodox Church story

People
 Jane Cowl (1883– 1950), American stage actress and playwright
 George Cowl (1878–1942), a British film actor

Other
 La Cagoule (The Cowl), a French political movement

See also
 Cowling (disambiguation)